Edward Winter (born 1773 at Dartford, Kent; died 10 March 1830 at Dartford) was an English professional cricketer who made 12 known appearances in first-class cricket matches from 1794 to 1815.

He was mainly associated with Berkshire.

References

1773 births
1830 deaths
English cricketers
English cricketers of 1787 to 1825
Berkshire cricketers